Gulf Stream Under the Iceberg is a 2012 Latvian drama film directed by Jevgeņijs Paškevičs. The film was selected as the Latvian entry for the Best Foreign Language Oscar at the 85th Academy Awards, but it did not make the final shortlist.

Cast
 Olga Shepitskaya
 Rēzija Kalniņa
 Ģirts Ķesteris
 Jānis Reinis
 Uldis Dumpis
 Pēteris Liepiņš
 Vigo Roga
 Regnārs Vaivars
 Aleksey Serebryakov
 Ksenia Rappoport
 Danila Kozlovsky
 Ville Haapasalo
 Yuriy Tsurilo
 Ekaterina Vilkova
 Anna Azarova
 Elena Morozova
 Tatyana Lyutaeva

See also
 List of submissions to the 85th Academy Awards for Best Foreign Language Film
 List of Latvian submissions for the Academy Award for Best Foreign Language Film

References

External links
 
 

2012 films
2012 drama films
Latvian drama films
2010s Russian-language films